Alberto Martín Gianfelice (born 12 June 1980) is a retired Argentinian footballer who played as forward.

He has played at Argentina, Chile, Colombia and Mexico.

Club career
He was born at Zárate, Buenos Aires in 1980. Nineteen years later, he joined Club Atlético Los Andes, team where he began to play football. However, he had a brief spell there, and in 2001 he moved to Chilean side Deportes Puerto Montt, which was brief too (only 6 months).

In mid-2001 he joined Club Almagro from the Primera B Metropolitana. He stayed there until 2003, being loaned during his spell, to Almirante Brown and Colombia’s Real Cartagena.

In June 2003, Gianfelice returned to his first club, Club Atlético Los Andes, playing the 2003–04 season at the second-tier. Nevertheless, at the end of that season, he was signed by Rosario Central from the Argentinian top-level.

After spells at Ben Hur and Mexico’s Correcaminos UAT during 2005, as well as All Boys and Independiente Rivadavia in 2006, the incoming year he joined Comunicaciones.

In December 2007, Gianfelice joined Chilean first-tier team Deportes La Serena. After failing to play any game during the 2008 Torneo Apertura, in the second half now at the Clausura, he played 14 games and scored five goals, one of them in a 2–0 Antofagasta, which wasn’t exempt of polemic due to obscene gestures.

In 2011, he returned to Chile, joining Rangers de Talca on loan from Comunicaciones, club which he returned in mid-2009 after playing for Estudiantes de Buenos Aires the first half of that year. For the 2013–14 season he was loaned again, now to Tristán Suárez. In 2015, he definitively left Comunicaciones and joined Defensores Unidos.

In 2016, Gianfelice signed for Asociación Deportiva Berazategui.

Statistics

References

External links
 
 Profile at BDFA 

1980 births
Living people
Argentine footballers
Argentine expatriate footballers
Argentine people of Italian descent
Association football forwards
People from Zárate, Buenos Aires
Sportspeople from Buenos Aires Province
Estudiantes de Buenos Aires footballers
Independiente Rivadavia footballers
Rosario Central footballers
Club Atlético Los Andes footballers
All Boys footballers
Club Almagro players
CSyD Tristán Suárez footballers
Puerto Montt footballers
Deportes La Serena footballers
Rangers de Talca footballers
Correcaminos UAT footballers
Club Almirante Brown footballers
Real Cartagena footballers
Club Comunicaciones footballers
Defensores Unidos footballers
A.D. Berazategui footballers
San Martín de Burzaco footballers
Chilean Primera División players
Categoría Primera A players
Argentine expatriate sportspeople in Chile
Argentine expatriate sportspeople in Mexico
Argentine expatriate sportspeople in Colombia
Expatriate footballers in Chile
Expatriate footballers in Mexico
Expatriate footballers in Colombia